Colleen Margaretta McCullough  (married name Robinson, previously Ion-Robinson; 1 June 193729 January 2015) was an Australian author known for her novels, her most well-known being The Thorn Birds and The Ladies of Missalonghi.

Life
McCullough was born in 1937 in Wellington, in the Central West region of New South Wales, to James and Laurie McCullough. Her father was of Irish descent and her mother was a New Zealander of part-Māori descent. During her childhood, the family moved around a great deal and she was also "a voracious reader".

Her family eventually settled in Sydney where she attended Holy Cross College, Woollahra, having a strong interest in both science and the humanities.

She had a younger brother, Carl, who drowned off the coast of Crete when he was 25 while trying to rescue tourists in difficulty. She based a character in The Thorn Birds on him, and also wrote about him in Life Without the Boring Bits.

Before her tertiary education, McCullough earned a living as a teacher, librarian and journalist. In her first year of medical studies at the University of Sydney she suffered dermatitis from surgical soap and was told to abandon her dreams of becoming a medical doctor. Instead, she switched to neuroscience and worked at Royal North Shore Hospital in Sydney.

In 1963, McCullough moved for four years to the United Kingdom; at the Great Ormond Street Hospital in London she met the chairman of the neurology department at Yale University who offered her a research associate job at Yale. She spent 10 years (April 1967 to 1976) researching and teaching in the Department of Neurology at the Yale Medical School in New Haven, Connecticut, United States. While at Yale she wrote her first two books. One of these, The Thorn Birds, became an international bestseller and one of the best selling books in history, with sales of over 30 million copies worldwide, that in 1983 inspired one of the most-watched television miniseries of all time.

Following The Thorn Birds, McCullough wrote her magnum opus: seven novels on the life and times of Julius Caesar, each a colossus weighing in at up to 1,000 pages. The Masters of Rome series preoccupied her for almost 30 years, from the early 1980s to the publication of the final volume in 2007. The research was a monumental task: a library of several thousand books and monographs on every aspect of Roman history and civilisation accumulated on the shelves of her home. She drew maps of cities and battlefields, scoured the world’s museums for busts and inscriptions, consulted experts in a dozen universities and recorded every known fact about her subject and his times.

The success of these books enabled her to give up her medical-scientific career and to try to "live on [her] own terms." In the late 1970s, after stints in London and Connecticut, she settled on the isolation of Norfolk Island, off the coast of mainland Australia, where she met her husband, Ric Robinson. They married in April 1984. Under his birth name Cedric Newton Ion-Robinson, he was a member of the Norfolk Legislative Assembly. He changed his name formally to Ric Newton Ion Robinson in 2002.

McCullough's 2008 novel, The Independence of Miss Mary Bennet engendered controversy with her reworking of characters from Jane Austen's Pride and Prejudice. Susannah Fullerton, the president of the Jane Austen Society of Australia, said she "shuddered" while reading the novel, as she felt that Elizabeth Bennet was rewritten as weak, and Mr. Darcy as savage. Fullerton said: "[Elizabeth] is one of the strongest, liveliest heroines in literature … [and] Darcy's generosity of spirit and nobility of character make her fall in love with him – why should those essential traits in both of them change in 20 years?"

Death

McCullough died on 29 January 2015, at the age of 77, in the Norfolk Island Hospital, Burnt Pine, from apparent renal failure after suffering from a series of small strokes. She had suffered from failing eyesight due to haemorrhagic macular degeneration, and also suffered from osteoporosis, trigeminal neuralgia, diabetes and uterine cancer, and used a wheelchair full-time.

She was buried in a traditional Norfolk Island funeral ceremony at the Emily Bay cemetery on the island.

Awards
In 1978, McCullough received the Golden Plate Award of the American Academy of Achievement. In 1984, a portrait of McCullough, painted by Wesley Walters, was a finalist in the Archibald Prize. The prize is awarded for the "best portrait painting preferentially of some man or woman distinguished in Art, Letters, Science or Politics". The depth of historical research for the novels on ancient Rome led to her being awarded a Doctor of Letters degree by Macquarie University in 1993.

Honours
McCullough was appointed an Officer of the Order of Australia on 12 June 2006, "[f]or service to the arts as an author and to the community through roles supporting national and international educational programs, medico-scientific disciplines and charitable organisations and causes".

Controversy
In an interview with The Sydney Morning Herald in November 2004 to promote Angel Puss, McCullough said the men of Pitcairn Island that were convicted of sexual encounters with children should have been allowed to follow their "custom" and have sex with young girls. "The Poms have cracked the whip and it's an absolute disgrace. These are indigenous customs and should not be touched. These were the first people to inhabit Pitcairn Island, and they are racially unique." she said. "It's hypocritical, too. Does anybody object when Muslims follow their customs?" The comments generated stories at the time, and were mentioned in her obituaries.

Bibliography

Selected novels
 Tim (1974)
 The Thorn Birds (1977)
 An Indecent Obsession (1981)
 A Creed for the Third Millennium (1985)
 The Ladies of Missalonghi (1987)
 The Song of Troy (1998)
 Morgan's Run (2000)
 The Touch (2003)
 Angel Puss (2005)
 The Independence of Miss Mary Bennet (2008)
 Bittersweet (2013)

Masters of Rome series
 The First Man in Rome (1990)
 The Grass Crown (1991)
 Fortune's Favourites (1993)
 Caesar's Women (1996)
 Caesar (1997)
 The October Horse (2002)
 Antony and Cleopatra (2007)

Carmine Delmonico series
McCullough also published five murder mysteries in the Carmine Delmonico series.
 On, Off (2006)
 Too Many Murders (December 2009)
 Naked Cruelty (2010)
 The Prodigal Son (2012)
 Sins of the Flesh (2013)

Biographical work
 The Courage and the Will: The Life of Roden Cutler VC (1999)

Memoir
 Life Without the Boring Bits (2011)

Screen adaptations
 Tim – made into a movie in 1979 starring Mel Gibson and Piper Laurie
 The Thorn Birds – made into a TV miniseries in 1983 starring Richard Chamberlain and Barbara Stanwyck
 An Indecent Obsession – made into a movie in 1985 starring Gary Sweet
 The Thorn Birds: The Missing Years – made into a TV miniseries in 1996 starring Richard Chamberlain. It covers a 14-year period from the novel which was omitted from the first production.

Notes

References
Mary Jean DeMarr: Colleen McCullough: A Critical Companion. Greenwood Publishing Group 1996; 

 
1937 births
2015 deaths
20th-century Australian novelists
21st-century Australian novelists
20th-century Australian women writers
21st-century Australian women writers
20th-century biographers
Australian biographers
Australian historical novelists
Australian medical writers
Australian people of Irish descent
Australian people of Māori descent
Australian people of New Zealand descent
Australian Roman Catholics
Australian women novelists
Deaths from cerebrovascular disease
Deaths from kidney failure
Officers of the Order of Australia
Women biographers
Writers from New South Wales
Writers of historical fiction set in antiquity
Norfolk Island writers
University of Sydney alumni
Yale School of Medicine faculty
Women historical novelists
Norfolk Island people of New Zealand descent
Australian women neuroscientists